Suroyo TV is an Assyrian/Chaldean/Syriac satellite television channel. Suroyo TV broadcasts from their studios in Södertälje, Sweden. Suroyo TV is a voice for the Assyrian/Chaldean/Syriac people and their cultural heritage, history and language, as such affiliated with the secular, leftist nationalist Dawronoye movement. The channel is mainly transmitted in Turoyo/Western Syriac and Arabic but they also have some content in Eastern Syriac, Swedish, English, and Turkish.

Currently, it has a wide range of programs ranging from programs designed for children, political and cultural debates to sports programs, from historical documentaries to religious and national events and from film reviews to musical (Syriac songs with video clips) and educational programs. Further, with its daily news programs that are broadcast in Syriac (eastern and western dialects) as well as in Arabic, it is an alternative news channel that is serving the members of the Assyrian/Chaldean/Syriac community that is scattered all around the world.

Suroyo TV is currently broadcasting 24 hours a day (5 hour production that is repeated 4 times within 24 hours. It is available on two satellites for its viewers in more than 85 countries around the world (Asia, Europe and America). They also post their news program online daily on their Youtube channel.

See also
ANB SAT
Suryoyo Sat
Ishtar TV
Ashur TV
KBSV
Assyria TV

References

External links
Suroyo TV

Aramaic-language television channels
Television channels and stations established in 2004
Dawronoye
2004 establishments in Sweden